Sir John Franklin (1786–1847) was a British Royal Navy officer and explorer of the Arctic.

John Franklin may also refer to:

 John Franklin (actor) (born 1959), American actor
 John Franklin (cyclist), British cyclist
 John Franklin (died 1831), Wiltshire monumental mason
 John Franklin (footballer) (1924–2005), English football forward
 John Franklin (headmaster), Australian headmaster of Christ's Hospital in England
 John Franklin III (born 1994), American football wide receiver
 John Franklin Bobbitt (1876–1956), American educationist
 John Franklin Enders (1897–1985), American biomedical scientist
 John Franklin-Myers (born 1996), American football defensive end
 John Hope Franklin (1915–2009), American historian
 John M. Franklin (1896–1975), American general
 John Rankin Franklin (1820–1878), American politician